Alpecin–Deceuninck is a UCI WorldTeam cycling team that is based in Belgium. It competes both in the road and cyclo-cross seasons. The leaders of the team have in the past been cyclo-cross world champion Niels Albert, Philipp Walsleben and Radomír Šimůnek. The team's current lead rider is the cyclocross world champion and Tour of Flanders winner Mathieu van der Poel.

In December 2017, the team announced that Corendon Airlines, a Turkish-Dutch airline company, and Circus, a Belgian betting company had signed three-year sponsorship deals. Circus, who also sponsor the UCI Continental team, ERA–Circus announced they would continue to do so until the end of the cyclo-cross season in March.

For the 2020 season the team rebranded itself as Alpecin–Fenix with German shampoo brand Alpecin and Italian interior design materials company Fenix becoming major sponsors for the team.

On May 16, 2022, the team announced that it would become Alpecin–Deceuninck for the start of the 2022 Tour de France on a 5-year deal bringing them in line with Alpecin and Canyon. This allowed the team to apply for a 2023–25 World Tour licence. The Fenix logo moved to the back of the shorts where Deceuninck used to be.

Team roster

Major wins

National champions
2015
 Dutch Cyclo-cross Championships, Mathieu van der Poel
2016
 Dutch Cyclo-cross Championships, Mathieu van der Poel
2017
 Dutch Cyclo-cross Championships, Mathieu van der Poel
2018
 Dutch Cyclo-cross Championships, Mathieu van der Poel
 Dutch Road Race Championships, Mathieu van der Poel
2019
 Dutch Cyclo-cross Championships, Mathieu van der Poel
 Belgium Road Race Championships, Tim Merlier
 European Track Championships (Madison), Lasse Norman Hansen
2020
 German Road Race Championships, Marcel Meisen
 Dutch Road Race Championships, Mathieu van der Poel
 Belgium Road Race Championships, Dries De Bondt
2021
 Switzerland Road Race Championships, Silvan Dillier
2022
 UCI Esports World Championships, Jay Vine

References

External links

UCI Professional Continental teams
Cycling teams based in Belgium
Cycling teams established in 2008